Jaroměř is a town in Náchod District in the Hradec Králové Region of the Czech Republic. It has about 12,000 inhabitants. It is known for the Josefov Fortress. Josefov is well preserved and is protected by law as an urban monument reservation, the historic town centre of Jaroměř is proceted as an urban monument zone.

Administrative parts
Town parts of Cihelny, Jakubské Předměstí, Josefov and Pražské Předměstí, and villages of Dolní Dolce, Jezbiny, Semonice and Starý Ples are administrative parts of Jaroměř.

Geography

It lies mostly in a flat agricultural landscape of the East Elbe Table. The eastern tip of the municipal territory extends into the Orlice Table.

The town lies at the confluence of the rivers Úpa, Metuje and Elbe. There is also the confluence of Metuje and Stará Metuje, which flows through the eastern part of the territory. There are several ponds in the municipal territory, the largest of them is Jaroměřský in the northern part.

In the area between the rivers Metuje and Stará Metuje is the Josefov Meadows Bird Reserve. It is home to many rare and endangered species of birds and amphibians thanks to its returning wetlands ecosystem.

History

The area around the local rivers was populated as early as 40,000 BC. The first written mention of Jaroměř is from 1126, when a fortress founded by Duke Jaromír is documented in the area of today's Church of Saint Nicholas. The village was probably promoted to a royal town by King Ottokar I of Bohemia and first referred to as a town in 1298. In 1307, it became a dowry town administered by Queen Elizabeth Richeza.

During the Hussite Wars, the town surrounded to Hussites. In 1437, it became a dowry town of Queen Barbara of Cilli, but the citizens did not want to give up its privileges and submit to the Queen. Barbara pledged the town to King George of Poděbrady in 1445. At the end of the 15th century, the town was badly damaged by a fire. After it recovered, it suffered during the Thirty Years' War. Despite the war, several Renaissance and Baroque monuments were created here at this time. In 1791, Jaroměř became again a royal town.

From 1780 to 1787, the Emperor Joseph II had built the imperial fortress Ples on the left bank of the Elbe and Metuje rivers to prevent the threat of a Prussian invasion. Later this conurbation took the name of Josefstadt (literally "Joseph's Town" or Josefov in Czech). The fortress was never attacked and was closed in 1888.

In the 19th century, industry and business developed in Jaroměř. The railroad was built in 1857.

In 1948, the town of Josefov and the villages of Dolní Dolce and Jezbiny were incorporated into Jaroměř.

Demographics

Transport
The D11 motorway runs west of the town.

Culture
Each summer, the town hosts the four-day Brutal Assault, the biggest central European extreme metal music festival. Over 10,000 metalheads from all over Europe attends the festival.

Sights

Jaroměř is best known for the Josefov Fortress. The fortress with the underground system is accessible and is one of the main tourist destinations of the region. In Josefov there is also the Church of the Ascension of the Virgin Mary. It was built in the Empire style in 1805–1811.

The historic centre of Jaroměř is located around the meander of the Elbe. On the square there is a Marian column designed by Matthias Braun from 1723–1727. The eastern side of the square is closed by the a town gate with bell tower, the last preserved element of town fortification, and by the Church of Saint Nicholas. It was built in the early 14th century. The church is one of the most significant church buildings of the High Czech Gothic and it used to be part of the fortification. Next to the church is a Baroque building of rectory from 1786.

Notable people
Géza Fejérváry (1833–1914), Hungarian general
Otakar Španiel (1881–1955), sculptor and engraver
Josef Šíma (1891–1971), painter
Zdeněk Veselovský (1928–2006), zoologist
Antonín Švorc (1934–2011), operatic bass-baritone
Ivo Pešák (1944–2011), singer and comic performer
Jiří Novák (born 1950), ice hockey player
Otto Dlabola (born 1973), pair skater
Andrea Kalousová (born 1996), model

Twin towns – sister cities

Jaroměř is twinned with:
 Warrington, England, United Kingdom
 Ziębice, Poland

References

External links

Official website 
Railway Museum Jaroměř

Cities and towns in the Czech Republic
Populated places in Náchod District
Populated riverside places in the Czech Republic
Populated places on the Elbe